Svante Larsson is a former football player born April 23, 1955. He played for IFK Norrköping between 1976 and 1977. He is the father of footballer Sebastian Larsson.

References

1955 births
Swedish footballers
IFK Norrköping players
Living people
Association football forwards
Place of birth missing (living people)